The 2nd AIBA African Olympic Boxing Qualifying Tournament was held from 24 March to 29 March 2008 in Windhoek, Namibia. It was  held at the Gymnasium Hall of the University of Namibia.

Qualifying
28 teams participated in this tournament:

Competition System 
The competition system just like at the 1st AIBA African 2008 Olympic Qualifying Tournament is the knockout round system. Each boxer fights one match per round.

Qualified Boxers

See also
 1st AIBA African 2008 Olympic Qualifying Tournament

References
2nd AIBA African Olympic Boxing Qualifying Tournament fact sheet

Qualification for the 2008 Summer Olympics
Boxing at the 2008 Summer Olympics
Boxing in Africa
Boxing
2008 in African sport
University of Namibia